Oreshak Peak is the peak rising to 2829 m in the Bangey Heights of north-central Sentinel Range in Ellsworth Mountains, Antarctica.  It is surmounting Patleyna Glacier to the south-southwest, Embree Glacier to the west and north, and Marsa Glacier to the east.

The peak is named after the settlements of Oreshak in Northern and Northeastern Bulgaria.

Location
US mapping in 1961, updated in 1988.

See also
 Mountains in Antarctica

Maps
 Vinson Massif.  Scale 1:250 000 topographic map.  Reston, Virginia: US Geological Survey, 1988.
 Antarctic Digital Database (ADD). Scale 1:250000 topographic map of Antarctica. Scientific Committee on Antarctic Research (SCAR). Since 1993, regularly updated.

Notes

References
 Oreshak Peak SCAR Composite Antarctic Gazetteer
 Bulgarian Antarctic Gazetteer Antarctic Place-names Commission (in Bulgarian)
 Basic data (in English)

External links
 Oreshak Peak. Copernix satellite image

Ellsworth Mountains
Mountains of Ellsworth Land
Bulgaria and the Antarctic